Blue Water High is an Australian television drama series, broadcast by the Australian Broadcasting Corporation on ABC1 and on Austar/Foxtel Nickelodeon channel in Australia and on various channels in many other countries. Each season follows the lives of a young group of students at Solar Blue, a high-performance surf academy where several lucky 16-year-olds are selected for a 12-month-long surfing program at Bilgola Beach, Sydney.

There are three series in Blue Water High. The first two series were screened in 2005 and 2006 and the producers did not intend to create a third and final series. However, due to popular demand by fans, they relented and made one more series with only Kate Bell returning in a main role. Series three ended with the closure of Solar Blue because of a lack of funding, indicating that the show would most likely not continue.

Plot summary

Series one
The first series consisted of twenty-six episodes. It starred Adam Saunders as Heath, the relaxed joker who struggles with school; Tahyna Tozzi as Perri, resident glamour queen from the Gold Coast; Sophie Luck as Fly, the youngest; Kate Bell as Bec, the local; Khan Chittenden as Edge, the aggressive and competitive teenager; Chris Foy as Matt, the generic 'smart guy' and Mara Scherzinger as Anna, a famous German Kiteboarder. At the end of the year, two of them (one girl and one boy) get a wild card spot on the pro-circuit tour. The first series was released on DVD in 4 volumes, though fans are strongly urging for a complete re-release featuring the entire season in one package, as was later done with Series Two. Sophie Luck won the 2005 Australian Film Institute Award for Best Young Actor for her role in the series. The winners for series one were Fly and Edge.

Series two
Filming of a second series began in early January 2006 in Sydney, with a revised cast, which included Sophie Luck who was back as Fly, Adam Saunders as Heath, who leaves in episode six and Trent Dalzell as Corey, Ryan Corr as Eric, Lesley Anne Mitchell as Brooke, Taryn Marler as Rachel, Gabrielle Scollay as Amy, and James Sorensen as Mike. It premiered on 28 June 2006. Sophie Luck, Adam Saunders, Kate Bell, Chris Foy, Tahyna Tozzi, Nadine Garner and Khan Chittenden have all reappeared in the second series in various episodes. The winners of Series Two were Brooke and Eric.

The complete second series was released on DVD in Australia on 1 October 2007.

Series three
The third and final series began filming in October 2007. Kate Bell returns as Bec for series three and is joined by Craig Horner as Garry. The new Solar Blue pupils are Guy (Kain O'Keeffe), Charley (Lachlan Buchanan), Adam (Eka Darville), Bridget (Cariba Heine), Loren (Amy Beckwith) and Cassie (Rebecca Breeds). Series Three began screening on Rollercoaster on 3 April 2008.

The winners are Bridget and Adam, but Bridget decides to go to university instead of joining the Pro Circuit, so Loren gets the wild card after Cassie literally 'draws the short straw' (as they both have the same number of points in the final surf-off, so they decide who gets the wild card this way). In the last episode, Simmo makes a surprise return as one of the three judges in what is described as "one of the best finals Solar Blue has seen", saving the day as he pulls "not a rabbit out of a hat, but an elephant", ensuring that the winners of the final surf-off still get a wild card invitation.

Cast

Series one

Kate Bell – Rebecca "Bec" Sanderson 
Khan Chittenden – Dean "Edge" Edgely 
Chris Foy – Matthew "Matt" Leyland
Sophie Luck – Fiona "Fly" Watson
Adam Saunders – Heath Carroll
Mara Scherzinger – Anna Peterson
Tahyna Tozzi – Perri Lawe
Martin Lynes – Craig "Simmo" Simmonds
Nadine Garner – Deborah "Deb" Callum
Liz Burch – Jilly
Matt Rudduck – Joe Sanderson
Clae Whitelaw – Simon Heart
Don Halbert – Mr. Savin

Series two

Ryan Corr – Eric Tanner
Gabrielle Scollay – Amy Reed
James Sorensen – Michael "Mike" Kruze
Lesley Anne Mitchell – Brooke Solomon
Trent Dalzell – Corey Petrie
Taryn Marler – Rachael Samuels
Adam Saunders – Heath Carroll
Sophie Luck – Fiona "Fly" Watson
Kate Bell – Rebecca "Bec" Sanderson
Martin Lynes – Craig "Simmo" Simmonds
Joe Ireland – Dave Jones
Liz Burch – Jilly
Natasha Sitkowski – Greta
Don Halbert – Mr. Savin

Series three

Kain O'Keeffe – Guy Spender
Lachlan Buchanan – Charley Prince
Eka Darville – Adam Bridge
Cariba Heine – Bridget Sanchez
Amy Beckwith – Lauren "Loren" Power
Rebecca Breeds – Cassandra "Cassie" Cometti
Craig Horner – Garry Miller
Kate Bell – Rebecca "Bec" Sanderson
Tom Fisher – James Cassidy
Erol Cimen – Michael De Santa
Don Halbert – Mr. Savin

List of episodes

Series one (May–November 2005)

Series two (June–December 2006)
Episodes of season 2 were not named but were numbered from 1 to 26.

Series three (April–September 2008) 
Episodes of season 3 were also not named, but were numbered from 1 to 26.

International broadcasts

Africa
In South Africa, Blue Water High was aired twice a week on Go on the local satellite system, DSTV. After DSTV added more MNET channels, Blue Water High started airing every weekday at 19:30 on Magic World 112 from 1 July 2010.

Europe
In Germany, the series is called Blue Water High, die Surf-Akademie (which means "Blue Water High, the Surf Academy") and is broadcast on KI.KA (a children's channel). In Ireland Blue Water High was broadcast on RTÉ Two as part of The Den and, in Spain, the show was broadcast on La 2, Clan TVE and Neox. In France, it was broadcast on Filles TV as Blue Water High: Surf Academy in 2007 and France Ô has started re-airing the series on 12 November 2012. In Norway the show aired on TV 2 Zebra. In Portugal, SIC also bought the first season, and it aired in the country from Monday to Friday at 5pm in Summer 2009; the show was named Mar Azul ("Blue Sea"). It also started again on SIC K in December of that year. The series also began airing on RTL 8 in the Netherlands from 2009 onwards. In the United Kingdom, it was broadcast on Boomerang and later on Pop Girl. In Portugal the series is called "Mar Azul" (Blue Sea) and it was first aired on Teenbox a teen program on the TV Channel SIC, Saturdays and Sundays, the three seasons aired, and then the TV show was transferred to the teen channel of SIC, called SIC K, and since then it has been aired frequently, even with some time interval, the series is aired till today, 2019.

North America
Blue Water High was broadcast online in USA through the former The WB Television Network, which was resurrected by the Warner Bros. television arm as a website in 2008. Currently, the series is now streaming on Tubi.

Oceania
In Australia, the country of its origin, Blue Water High aired once every week on ABC3.  In New Zealand, Blue Water High currently airs every Saturday afternoon on TV2

South America
In the Spanish-speaking countries of Latin America, the show is titled Blue Water High, Escuela del Surf, which translates as "Blue Water High, Surf Academy", and is broadcast on Boomerang Latin America. In Brazil, it is broadcast by Boomerang Brazil and TV Brasil under the title Galera do Surfe (The Surf Crowd). In Falkland Islands, Blue Water High was aired on Falkland Islands Television Service Tuesdays to Friday at 15:00 and Saturday at 11:30.

Home media

DVD releases
Season 03 was not originally released on DVD. But in October 2020 a Complete collection boxset was release which included all three seasons.

Online streaming 
All Season s of Blue Water High are currently streaming for release on 7plus

References

External links
Blue Water High  at the Australian Television Information Archive

Blue Water High at the National Film and Sound Archive
Blue Water High - "Winners and Losers" at Australian Screen Online

2005 Australian television series debuts
2008 Australian television series endings
Australian drama television series
Australian Broadcasting Corporation original programming
Australian high school television series
Television shows set in Sydney
Television series by Endemol Australia
Australian children's television series
English-language television shows
Television series about teenagers